Nicholas Smith may refer to:

Nicholas Smith (actor) (1934–2015), English television actor
Nicholas Smith (cricketer) (born 1946), New Zealand cricketer
Nick Smith (footballer, born 1984), Australian rules football player for Melbourne
Nick Smith (footballer, born 1988), Australian rules football player for the Sydney Swans
Nicholas D. Smith, American philosopher
Nicholas H. Smith, Australian philosopher (Macquarie University)
Nicholas J. J. Smith, Australian philosopher (University of Sydney)
Nicholas G. Smith (1881–1945), American leader in The Church of Jesus Christ of Latter-day Saints
Nicholas Smith (MP), English politician
Nicholas M. Smith Jr. (1914–2003), nuclear physicist and research consultant
Nicholas Smith (Illinois politician), member of the Illinois House of Representatives 
Nicholas Hankey Smith (1771–1837), British diplomat

See also
Nick Smith (disambiguation)
Nicolaas Smit (1832–1896), Boer general
Nicky Smith (disambiguation)